Taipei Public Library Beitou Branch is a public library in Beitou Park, located within Beitou District, Taipei, Taiwan. It is Taiwan's first green library.

History
The library was opened in November 2006.

Architecture

It is a two-storey building and it is notable as being constructed to be an eco-friendly green building, in which the building was designed to curb water and electricity consumption. It was designed by Bio-Architecture Formosana. The building uses large windows to reduce the consumption of lighting electricity. The roof was designed to be partially covered with photovoltaic cells to generate electricity and also designed to capture rain water to be stored and used to flush toilets.

Transportation
The library is accessible within walking distance East from Xinbeitou Station of the Taipei Metro.

See also
 List of libraries in Taipei

References

2006 establishments in Taiwan
Library buildings completed in 2006
Libraries established in 2006
Libraries in Taipei
Public libraries in Taiwan
Sustainable buildings and structures